North Horr is a settlement and Sub-County in Kenya's Eastern Province.

It is a village within North Horr Constituency with a population of 4,421 in its electoral ward in 2005.

Catholic missionaries established a school there in 1965.

References 

Populated places in Eastern Province (Kenya)